Herencia Musical: 20 Corridos Inolvidables (Eng.: 20 Unforgettable Corridos) is the title of a compilation album released by Regional Mexican band Los Tigres del Norte. This album became their fourth number-one hit on the Billboard Top Latin Albums chart.

Track listing
This information from Billboard.com

CD
Morir Matando (Teodoro Bello) — 3:17
El Zorro de Ojinaga (Paulino Vargas) — 3:38
La Paloma (Sebastian Yradier) — 3:04
El Gringo y el Mexicano (Adolfo Salas) — 3:06
La Fuga del Rojo (Vargas) — 3:15
Tiempos de Mayo (Enrique Calencia) — 3:31
El Tahúr (Adolfo Salas) — 3:37
El Corrido del Doctor (Vargas) — 3:34
El Rengo del Gallo Giro (Bello) — 3:05
El Hijo Tijuana (Francisco Quintero) — 3:39
El Tamal (Bello) — 3:07
Los Tres de Zacatecas (Bello) — 2:23
El Avión de la Muerte (Bello) — 4:04
Pacas de a Kilo (Bello) — 3:35
En Nombre de Tu Padre (Vargas) — 2:52
La Resortera (Bello) — 3:21
Jefe de Jefes (Bello) — 3:33
El Tarasco (Vargas) — 3:40
También las Mujeres Pueden (Quintero) — 3:36
Gabino Barrera (Víctor Cordero) — 3:15

DVD
La Reina del Sur (Bello)
Jefe de Jefes (Bello)
De Rama en Rama (Bello)
El Triunfo (Jessie Armenta)
Los Dos Plebes (Quintero)
Con Qué Derecho (Demetrio Vite)

Chart performance

Sales and certifications

References

Los Tigres del Norte compilation albums
2003 compilation albums
2003 video albums
Music video compilation albums
Spanish-language compilation albums